Gibson City-Melvin-Sibley School District is a K-12 public school district based in Gibson City, Illinois.

GCMS organized through a consolidation between the Gibson City and Melvin-Sibley "Mel-Sib" school districts in 1993. All of the district's school buildings are located within Gibson City, but the middle school was located in the old Melvin-Sibley High School in Melvin until 2001. The district has three schools, GCMS Elementary School, GCMS Middle School, and the GCMS High School.

The superintendent of GCMS is  Jeremy Darnell. The three principals of the district are Justin Kean (elementary), Kyle Bielfelt (middle), and Chris Garard (high school).

The high schools' sports teams compete in the Heart of Illinois Conference and are called the GCMS Falcons. The longtime mascot of Gibson City was the Greyhounds, while Mel-Sib's was the Rams. The GCMS football team has been to the IHSA state playoffs for eight years in a row. They finished 4th in 2009. In 2017, the Falcons won the first ever team state championship in Gibson City and GCMS history by defeating the Maroa-Forsyth Trojans at Huskie Stadium in DeKalb. The school's track team has produced multiple state champions, most recently in 2012.

GCMS's Project Ignition, a program designed to teach awareness about distracted and safe driving, won a national competition in 2006.

GCMS recently (April 2011) completed a renovation/addition to its elementary school building. New windows were added to all classrooms for the first time.

External links
Official site

School districts in Illinois
Education in Ford County, Illinois
School districts established in 1993
1993 establishments in Illinois